Greg Reed (born June 5, 1965) is an American politician. He serves as a Republican member of the Alabama Senate, representing the 5th District since 2010. He defeated Democrat Brett Wadsworth in the 2010 midterm elections to replace Charles Bishop in the 5th District. As of 2021, he is the Senate's president pro tempore.

Career
Reed was named Chairman of the Alabama Senate Health Committee for the 2011 term. During his tenure, he sponsored and passed Medicaid reform legislation that created Regional Care Organizations (RCOs). RCOs are self-sustaining managed care organizations that receive a capitated amount from Alabama Medicaid each year to provide services to Medicaid recipients within the RCO's geographical area.

Reed made national news in February 2012 when he was questioned about his possible conflict of interest over serving as vice-president of an ultrasound company while pushing a bill that would require women seeking abortions to first have a transvaginal ultrasound performed.

He stated that a conflict of interest did not exist because of his company's policy of not doing business with abortion clinics. Reed continued to deny conducting business with abortion clinics even after written price quotes surfaced from an abortion provider by his company.

In November 2014, Reed was re-elected unopposed. His peers elected him to the position of Majority Leader right after his re-election to the Alabama State Senate.

The Alabama Association of Resource, Conservation and Development (AARCD) Councils named Reed the 2015 Senate Leader of the Year at their annual meeting in April 2015.

During the 2015 legislative session, Reed continued his Medicaid spearheaded legislation to create Integrated Care Networks (ICNs). The legislation allows ICNs to contract with Medicaid to provide long-term care under a capitated system. Alabama Medicaid estimates it will save taxpayers $1.5 billion over the first ten years.

In May 2019, he voted to make abortion a crime at any stage in a pregnancy, without exemptions for cases of rape or incest.

References

External links
 Senator Greg Reed official government website
 Project Vote Smart – Senator Greg Reed (AL) profile
 2010 campaign contributions

|-

1965 births
21st-century American politicians
Republican Party Alabama state senators
Living people
People from Jasper, Alabama